Shermukhammad Jandreev (born 4 September 1996) is an Uzbekistani judoka.

He won a medal at the 2021 World Judo Championships.

References

External links

1996 births
Living people
Uzbekistani male judoka
Kurash practitioners at the 2018 Asian Games
Medalists at the 2018 Asian Games
Asian Games gold medalists for Uzbekistan
Asian Games medalists in kurash